The Stanford Cardinal women's basketball team represents Stanford University, located in Stanford, California. The school's team currently competes in the Pac-12 Conference and are coached by Tara VanDerveer, in her 35th season with the Cardinal. The Cardinal won national championships in 1990, 1992 and 2021, and were runners-up in 2008 and 2010.

Season-by-season results

NCAA tournament results

References

External links